Marian Elizabeth Washington (born August 26, 1946) is a former women's basketball coach, mostly known for her career at the University of Kansas, a post she held for over 30 years. Throughout her career, Washington achieved multiple awards and accomplishments which include achieving membership in the Women's Basketball Hall of Fame, leading KU to extensive victories, coaching her team in a number of NCAA Tournaments, and receiving the Black Coaches Association Lifetime Achievement Award. Washington was inducted into the Women's Basketball Hall of Fame in 2004.

Early years
Raised on a farm near West Chester, Pennsylvania, Washington played seven sports at Henderson High School in West Chester.

College

Washington attended West Chester State College, where she played basketball on the team that won the first national women's tournament in 1969. That tournament was held under the auspices of the CIAW, a predecessor to the AIAW women's basketball tournament.

Coaching
After one year as an assistant coach, Washington served as head coach for the Kansas Jayhawks women's basketball team at the University of Kansas from 1973 to 2004. Washington was also women's athletic director at Kansas from 1974 to 1979.

USA Basketball
Washington was chosen as the head coach of the team representing the USA in 1982 at the William Jones Cup competition in Taipei, Taiwan. The team started out strongly, winning their first four games by 16 or more points. In the fifth game, they were matched against Australia. The game was close until the end. With a half-minute remaining, the USA held a one-point margin. The USA extended the lead to three points on two free throws, the Aussies brought it back to one with two free throws of their own, and the USA hit two free throws with two second left in the game to secure the 65–62 victory. The next two games were easy victories, then the USA faced unbeaten Canada in the final game. The game was very close, but the USA fell to Canada 70–67 to finish with a single loss and the silver medal. USA players Lea Henry and  Paula McGee were named to the All-Tournament Team.
 
In 1996, Washington served as an assistant coach on the USA National Team, which went on to win the gold medal at the 1996 Summer Olympics in Atlanta, Georgia.

Head coaching record
Source:

*Washington resigned with three games remaining in the 2003–04 season; assistant Lynette Woodard served as head coach for the remainder of the season and went 0–3 for a cumulative season record of 9–19 (2–14 Big 12) and 11th place finish.

Awards and honors
 1991 — Carol Eckman Award

Notes

References
 
 

1946 births
Living people
African-American basketball coaches
American women's basketball coaches
Basketball coaches from Pennsylvania
Kansas Jayhawks women's basketball coaches
People from West Chester, Pennsylvania
Sportspeople from Chester County, Pennsylvania
West Chester University alumni
21st-century African-American people
20th-century African-American sportspeople